The Song of the Sea (Shirat HaYam, also known as Az Yashir Moshe and Song of Moses, or Mi Chamocha) is a poem that appears in the Book of Exodus of the Hebrew Bible, at . It is followed in verses 20 and 21 by a much shorter song sung by Miriam and the other women. The Song of the Sea was reputedly sung by the Israelites after their crossing the Red Sea in safety, and celebrates the destruction of the Egyptian army during the crossing, and looks forward to the future conquest of Canaan.

The poem is included in Jewish prayer books, and recited daily in the morning shacharit services. The poem also comprises the first ode or hymn of the Eastern Orthodox canon, where it is known as the Song or Ode of Moses. It is also used in the Roman Catholic, Eastern Orthodox, and other Christian liturgies at the Easter Vigil when the history of salvation is recounted. These traditions follow Revelation 15:3 by calling it the "Song of Moses" (not to be confused with the Song of Moses in Deuteronomy).

The poem forms part of the sixteenth weekly Torah portion, or parshat Beshalach. The Sabbath on which it is read is known as Sabbath of the Song (שבת שירה). It is one of only two sections of the Sefer Torah (Torah scroll) that is written with a different layout from the normal simple columns. The other section written differently is the Song of Moses at the end of Deuteronomy, in the 53rd weekly portion, or parshat Ha'azinu.

Origin

The Song of the Sea is noted for its archaic language. It is written in a style of Hebrew much older than that of the rest of Exodus. A number of scholars consider it the oldest surviving text describing the Exodus, dating to the pre-monarchic period. An alternative is that it was deliberately written in an archaic style, a known literary device. As such, proposed dates for its composition range from the 13th to the 5th century BCE.

Page layout
The Ashkar-Gilson Manuscript is a fragment of a 7th or 8th century Torah scroll that contains the Song of the Sea. Some scholars have argued that the "brickwork" pattern of the Ashkar-Gilson version shows that the Masoretes accurately copied earlier manuscripts. This pattern was not used in the Dead Sea Scrolls. A similar pattern is used in modern Torah scrolls, and the Ashkenazi and Sepharadi Torah scrolls differ from the Yemenite scrolls in the arrangement of the very last line.

Text

{| class="wikitable"
|-
!  width=50%  |Masoretic Text 
!Transliteration!! width="50%" | English translation (New International Version)
|-
| align="right"|
|wayyōʾmərū lēʾmōr ʾāšīrā laYHWH kī-gāʾō gāʾā,sūs wərōḵəḇō rāmā ḇayyām
| 1 Then Moses and the Israelites sang this song to the Lord:
"I will sing to the Lord,
    for he is highly exalted.
Both horse and driver
    he has hurled into the sea.
|-
| align="right"|

|ze ʾēlī wəʾanwēhū ʾĕlōhē ʾāḇī waʾărōməmenhū
|2 "The Lord is my strength and my defense;
    he has become my salvation.
He is my God, and I will praise him,
    my father’s God, and I will exalt him.
|-
|align="right"|

|YHWH ʾīš mīlḥāmā YHWH šəmō
|3 The Lord is a warrior;
    the Lord is his name.
|-
|align="right"|

|ūmīḇḥar šālīšāyw ṭubbəʿū ḇəYam-Sūp̄
|4 Pharaoh’s chariots and his army
    he has hurled into the sea.
The best of Pharaoh’s officers
    are drowned in the Red Sea.
|-
| align="right"|

|təhōmōṯ yəḵasyumū yārəḏū ḇīmṣōlōṯ kəmō-ʾāḇen
|5 The deep waters have covered them;
    they sank to the depths like a stone.
|-
| align="right"|

|yəmīnḵā YHWH neʾdārī bakkōaḥyəmīnḵā YHWH tīrʿaṣ ʾōyēḇ
|6 Your right hand, Lord,
    was majestic in power.
Your right hand, Lord,
    shattered the enemy.
|-
|align="right"|

|ūḇərōḇ gəʾōnəḵā tahărōs qāmēḵātəšallaḥ ḥărōnəḵā yōʾḵlēmō kaqqaš
|7 "In the greatness of your majesty
    you threw down those who opposed you.
You unleashed your burning anger;
    it consumed them like stubble.
|-
| align="right"|

|ūḇərūaḥ ʾappēḵā neʿermū mayīm
|8 By the blast of your nostrils
    the waters piled up.
The surging waters stood up like a wall;
    the deep waters congealed in the heart of the sea.
|-
| align="right"|

|ʾāmar ʾōyēḇ ʾerdōp̄ ʾassīgʾăḥallēq šālāl tīmlāʾēmō nap̄šīʾārīq ḥarbī tōrīšēmō yāḏī‎
|9 The enemy boasted,
    ‘I will pursue, I will overtake them.
I will divide the spoils;
    I will gorge myself on them.
I will draw my sword
    and my hand will destroy them.’
|-
| align="right"|

|nāšap̄tā ḇərūḥăḵā kīssāmō yāmṣālălū kaʿōp̄ereṯ bəmayīm ʾaddīrīm
|10 But you blew with your breath,
    and the sea covered them.
They sank like lead
    in the mighty waters.
|-
| align="right"|

|mī-ḵāmōḵā bāʾēlīm YHWHmī kāmōḵā neʾdār baqqōḏešnōrāʾ ṯəhīllōṯ ʿōsē p̄eleʾ‎|11 Who among the gods
    is like you, Lord?
Who is like you—
    majestic in holiness,
awesome in glory,
    working wonders?
|-
| align="right"|

|nāṭīṯā yəmīnḵā tiḇlāʿēmō ʾāreṣ|12 "You stretch out your right hand,
    and the earth swallows your enemies.
|-
| align="right"|

|nāḥīṯā ḇəḥasdəḵā ʿam-zū gāʾālətānēhaltā ḇəʿāzzəḵā ʾel-nəwē qoḏšeḵā‎|13 In your unfailing love you will lead
    the people you have redeemed.
In your strength you will guide them
    to your holy dwelling.
|-
| align="right"|

|šāməʿū ʿammīm yīrgāzūn ḥīl ʾāḥaz yōšəḇē Pəlāšeṯ|14 The nations will hear and tremble;
    anguish will grip the people of Philistia.
|-
| align="right"|

|ʾāz nīḇhălū ʾallūp̄ē ʾĔḏōm ʾēlē Mōʾāḇ yōʾḥăzēmō rāʿaḏnāmōgū kōl yōšəḇē Ḵənāʿan|15 The chiefs of Edom will be terrified,
    the leaders of Moab will be seized with trembling,
the people of Canaan will melt away;
|-
|align="right"|

|tīppōl ʿălēhem ʾēmāṯā wāp̄aḥaḏbigḏōl zərōʿăḵā yīddəmū kāʾāḇenʿaḏ-yaʿăḇōr ʿamməḵā YHWH ʿaḏ-yaʿăḇōr ʿam-zū qānīṯā|16     terror and dread will fall on them.
By the power of your arm
    they will be as still as a stone—
until your people pass by, Lord,
    until the people you bought pass by.
|-
|align="right"|

|təḇīʾēmō wəṯīṭṭāʿēmō bəhar naḥălāṯəḵā|17 You will bring them in and plant them
    on the mountain of your inheritance—
the place, Lord, you made for your dwelling,
    the sanctuary, Lord, your hands established.
|-
|align="right"|
|YHWH yīmlōḵ ləʿōlām wāʿeḏ|18 "The Lord reigns
    for ever and ever."
|-
|align="right"|

|kī ḇāʾ sūs Parʿō bəriḵbō ūḇəp̄ārāšāyw bayyām wayyāšeḇ YHWH ʿălēhem ʾeṯ-mē hayyām ūḆənē Yīsrāʾēl hāləḵū ḇayyabbāšā bəṯōḵ hayyām|19 When Pharaoh's horses, chariots and horsemen went into the sea, the Lord brought the waters of the sea back over them, but the Israelites walked through the sea on dry ground. 
|-
| align="right"|

|wattīqqaḥ Mīrəyām hannəḇīʾā ʾăḥōṯ ʾAhărōn ʾeṯ-hattōp̄ bəyāḏā wattēṣeʾnā ḵāl-hannāšīm ʾaḥărēhā bəṯuppīm ūḇīmḥōlōṯ|20 Then Miriam the prophet, Aaron's sister, took a timbrel in her hand, and all the women followed her, with timbrels and dancing. 
|-
| align="right"|

|wattaʿan lāhem Mīrəyāmšīrū laYHWH kī-gāʾō gāʾāsūs wərōḵəḇō rāmā ḇayyām||21 Miriam sang to them:

Sing to the Lord,
    for he is highly exalted.
Both horse and driver
    he has hurled into the sea.
|}

Ketuba of the Seventh Day of Pesah
The Ketubá del Seten Dia de Pesah (or כתובה ליום השביעי של פסח – Ketuba Le-yom Ha-shebi`i shel Pesah) is a liturgical poem in Ladino, describing Pharaoh's defeat in the Sea of Reeds. Most Jewish communities sing this poem on 21 Nisan, the seventh day of Passover. According to Jewish tradition, this is the day on which Pharaoh's army was drowned in the Sea of Reeds, and the Israelite people sang the Song of the Sea in gratitude for this victory.

Presumably, this text is called a ketuba ("marriage contract") because the relationship between God and the Jewish people is traditionally described as a marriage, and the splitting of the sea is considered to be an important event leading to that marriage, which ultimately took place 42 days later, at Mt. Sinai.

A tune for the Ladino poem along with the entire text itself can be found in Isaac Levy's Anthology of Sepharadic Hazzanut.

Musical settings

In Hebrew Cantillation, the Song is given a unique, festive tune, not bound to the ordinary trope marks.

The following settings exist for the Song of the Sea:

 Cantique de Moïse (French) Étienne Moulinié.
 Canticum Moysis (Latin) Fernando de las Infantas.
 Cantemus Domino Ascanio Trombetti.
 Part Three of Handel's 1739 oratorio Israel in Egypt, entitled Moses' Song.
 Mirjams Siegesgesang (Miriam's Song of Triumph), Op. 136, D. 942 by Franz Schubert.

Some of the song features in the 1998 animated film The Prince of Egypt. The text consists of a few selected lines and paraphrases from the Hebrew text inserted in the bridge of the song When You Believe''.

Portions of the song are paraphrased in both of the melodic and textual variations of the popular African-American gospel music song, "O Mary Don't You Weep".

References

External links
 A collection of articles on the Song of the Sea from a Jewish perspective. at Chabad.org
 Biblical Hebrew Poetry - Reconstructing the Original Oral, Aural and Visual Experience
 Song of the Sea (Exodus 15:1b-18) Reconstructed

Book of Exodus
Canticles
Documentary hypothesis
Jewish prayer and ritual texts
Pesukei dezimra
Yam Suph
Siddur of Orthodox Judaism
Jewish poetry
Moses
Hebrew words and phrases in Jewish prayers and blessings